Kapil Muni Karwariya  is an Indian Politician and a member of the 15th Lok Sabha of India. He represented the Phulpur (Lok Sabha constituency) of Uttar Pradesh and is a member of the Bahujan Samaj Party political party.

Education
Shri Kapil Muni holds LL.B. degree in 1990 from Lucknow University, Uttar Pradesh. He was an advocate by profession before entering into political world.
He married Kalpana Karwariya, from a Hindu Brahmin family.

Life imprisonment
A court in Prayagraj sentenced former BSP MP Kapil Muni Karwariya, his brothers Uday Bhan Karwariya and Suraj Bhan Karwariya and their uncle Ram Chandra to life imprisonment for the murder of then Samajwadi Party MLA Jawahar Yadav (Pandit) 23 years ago.

Posts held

See also

List of members of the 15th Lok Sabha of India
Politics of India
Parliament of India
Government of India

References 

India MPs 2009–2014
Living people
1967 births
Bahujan Samaj Party politicians from Uttar Pradesh
People from Kaushambi district
People from Allahabad district
Lok Sabha members from Uttar Pradesh